Kaja Verdnik (born 23 February 1999) is a Slovenian snowboarder. She competed in the 2018 Winter Olympics, in the Women's Halfpipe.

References

1999 births
Living people
Snowboarders at the 2018 Winter Olympics
Slovenian female snowboarders
Olympic snowboarders of Slovenia
Snowboarders at the 2016 Winter Youth Olympics